Grupul 1 Aeronautic ("1st Aeronautical Group" in English), also known as Grupul 1 Aviație ("1st Aviation Group") was one of the three groups of the Romanian Air Corps created following the aviation reorganization in the winter of 1916/1917.

History
After the reorganization of the Romanian Air Corps in the winter of 1916/1917, under the advice of the French Military Mission, 3 Aeronautical groups were created. Each composed of 2 reconnaissance and 1 fighter squadrons and each assigned to a Romanian or Russian army. Grupul 1 Aeronautic with its headquarters at Bacău was assigned to the 2nd Romanian Army.

The group, commanded by Major (Maj.) Sturdza, was composed the following squadrons:
Escadrila F.2 - commanded by Captain (Cpt.)  (until March), then by Captain Panait Cholet
Escadrila F.6 - commanded by Cpt. Scarlat Ștefănescu
Escadrila N.1 - commanded by Cpt.

Campaign of 1917
Grupul 1 Aeronautic together with Grupul 2 Aeronautic contributed to the Battle of Mărăști. On 15 August 1917, the airmen of the group carried out 18 reconnaissance, bombing missions, photographing the enemy positions on the front of the 2nd Romanian Army.

In preparation for an offensive on the Oituz Valley, the airmen of Grupul 1 Aeronautic executed numerous reconnaissance missions between 3 - 7 September 1917, the fighter pilots of N.1 squadron continued patrolling the front-line, engaging aircraft of the Central Powers. On 8 September, airmen of the F.2 and N.1 squadrons engaged enemy aircraft over Târgu Ocna,  and Slănic. The next day, managing to shoot down 3 aircraft. Between 9 - 12 September, 18 combat missions were completed, with dogfights being carried out in 12 of them.

From 22 September 1917, Grupul 1 Aeronautic was composed of:
Escadrila F.2 and Escadrila N.1 - with the aerodrome at Borzești
Escadrila F.6 - at Gârbovanul

1918
From January 1918, Grupul 1 Aeronautic was commanded by Maj. Athanase Enescu. All squadrons of the group were located at Bacău.

Following Order no. 275/1918, the squadrons of the group were moved to auxiliary airfields, closer to the front-line in Bessarabia.

1919
In 1919, the N.1 and B.4 (ex-F.4) squadrons, part of Grupul 1 Aviație commanded by Major Ștefan Protopopescu, set their base at Chișinău, in order to support the Romanian troops of Grupul general Popovici. Escadrila N.10, which was part of Grupul 3 Aeronautic, was also sent to the front, being based at Cernăuți. All 3 squadrons executed mainly reconnaissance and bombing missions.

See also
 Grupul 2 Aeronautic
 List of Romanian Air Force units

References

Aviation history of Romania
Romania in World War I
Romanian Air Corps units